Lord Snowdon or similar names may refer to:

Antony Armstrong-Jones, 1st Earl of Snowdon
David Armstrong-Jones, 2nd Earl of Snowdon
Philip Snowden, 1st Viscount Snowden

See also Snowdon (disambiguation) and Snowden (disambiguation)